Louise Tate (born 1965), is a female former swimmer who competed for England.

Swimming career
Tate became National champion in 1982 when she won the 1982 ASA National British Championships title in the 400 metres medley.

Tate represented England in the 200  and 400 metres individual medley, at the 1982 Commonwealth Games in Brisbane, Queensland, Australia.

References

1965 births
English female swimmers
Swimmers at the 1982 Commonwealth Games
Living people
Commonwealth Games competitors for England